Larry the Cable Guy: Health Inspector is a 2006 American comedy film starring American stand-up comedian Larry the Cable Guy. Larry, a municipal restaurant health inspector, is assigned a new rookie partner after recklessly closing restaurants for code violations, Amy Butlin (Iris Bahr), by his boss, Bart Tatlock (Tom Wilson).  Together, Larry and Amy work to solve a series of food poisonings at four-star restaurants.

Plot
Larry is a big city health inspector with questionable practices and his own way of doing things. Larry's boss, Bart Tatlock, in an attempt to acquire information on his activities in order to get him fired, assigns Larry a new partner, Amy Butlin, a by-the-book professional who takes the job seriously. She tries to learn the ropes of health inspection while putting up with Larry and his personality as well as getting the information Tatlock needs to get Larry fired.

As Larry and Amy do their job as city health inspection team, a serial criminal is poisoning four-star restaurants. Trying to avert a panic, and keep the matter of the poisonings under control, Tatlock puts his best people on the job, and not Larry. Larry and Amy are called in on one of the poisonings, but Tatlock forbids them from working on such an important case. Larry and Amy continue to inspect lower-profile restaurants, but the mammophilic Mayor Maurice T. Gunn is tricked into assigning Larry and Amy to the more important poison case, much to Larry and Amy's enthusiasm. Larry and Amy go undercover at one of the restaurants, and obtain a tape recording of a conversation between the Mayor Gunn and Chef Leon, in which the chef clarifies Gunn's request that the food being prepared by Chef Leon be poisoned.

Larry and Amy interrupt the mayor during an interview with their evidence, but the mayor explains that Chef Leon was reacting to the mayor's instruction to put French's mustard on the Gunn's chicken piccata, an act that the insulted Chef Leon viewed as a metaphorical act of "poisoning" to his life's work. When Larry speaks to Chef Leon over the phone, Chef Leon corroborates this interpretation. As a result, Tatlock fires Larry.

Despondent, Larry visits his old friend Big Shug, but ends up alienating him as well. Heading over to his romantic interest, Jane's house, Larry sees she and her mother (Lisa Lampanelli) are enjoying a friendly social visit by the mayor. Feeling as if his life has hit rock bottom, Larry resolves to solve the poisoning crimes. He confronts Mayor Gunn, who reveals that Lily Micelli, the owner of Micelli's restaurant, had him make sure that Larry was assigned to the poisonings case. Larry and Amy realize that Micelli did this so to ensure that case was investigated incompetently, as she is the one behind the poisonings. At a taping of the television cook-off show, Top Chef, Larry and Amy expose Micelli's culpability and arrest her, and are vindicated.

Cast
 Dan Whitney (Larry the Cable Guy) as Larry, the Health Inspector
 Iris Bahr as Amelia “Amy” Butlin
 Megyn Price as Jane Whitley
 Lisa Lampanelli as Jane's mother
 Brooke Dillman as Brenda
 David Koechner as Donnie
 Kid Rock as himself
 Joanna Cassidy as Lily Micelli
 Joe Pantoliano as Mayor Maurice T. Gunn
 Tony Hale as Jack Dabbs
 Bruce Bruce as Big Shug
 Thomas F. Wilson as Bart Tatlock (credited as Tom Wilson)
 Jerry Mathers as himself

Production
In March 2005, Paramount Home Entertainment signed Parallel Entertainment Pictures to a multiyear first-look deal involving six straight-to-DVD programs involving the Blue Collar Comedy Tour, including the in development Larry the Cable Guy: Health Inspector. Paramount set the film for a March 31 theatrical release in December of 2005, before exchanging the release to Lionsgate in February 2006.

Reception
The film earned $15,680,099 at the American box office.

The film was panned by critics. On Rotten Tomatoes, it has an approval rating of 5% based on reviews from 39 critics. The website's consensus states: "An aggressively lowbrow vehicle for its titular star, this gross-out comedy fails to "git-r-done." On Metacritic it has a score of 21% based on reviews from 14 critics, indicating "Generally unfavorable reviews". Audiences polled by CinemaScore gave the film an average grade "B+" on an A+ to F scale.
Rotten Tomatoes ranked Larry The Cable Guy: Health Inspector #85 on its "The 100 Worst Reviewed Films of All Time: 2000-2009" list.

Joe Leydon of Variety wrote: "Entirely comfortable as the crude character he has honed in countless stand-up routines and TV appearances, Larry the Cable Guy sustains a level of likeability that enables him to get away with a lot more than he has any right to. But, he remains very much an acquired taste."
J. R. Jones of the Chicago Reader wrote: "Though some of his one-liners are pretty good, his shtick can't sustain this dutifully scripted comedy."

Lou Lumenick of the New York Post called it "Virtually unwatchable and laugh-free."

Awards

The film was nominated for one Golden Raspberry Award, Larry the Cable Guy was nominated in the "Worst Actor" category.

Home media
The DVD was released August 8, 2006.

References

External links
 

2006 films
American comedy films
2006 comedy films
Country music films
Lionsgate films
2000s English-language films
2000s American films